Jean-Baptiste Boffinton (27 August 1817 – 11 December 1899) was a French Bonapartist politician.

Life

Jean-Baptiste Stanislas Boffinton was born on 27 August 1817, in Bordeaux, Gironde.
He was a member of the National Assembly for Charente-Inférieure from 11 May 1873 to 7 March 1876, and sat with the Appel au peuple parliamentary group. He was a Senator from 30 January 1876 to 24 January 1885. During his campaign for the senate, Boffinton and the former deputies Auguste Roy de Loulay and Alfred de Vast-Vimeux signed a circular in which they declared,

Jean-Baptiste Boffinton died on 11 December 1899 in Arcachon, Gironde.

References

Sources

1817 births
1899 deaths
Politicians from Bordeaux
Appel au peuple
Members of the National Assembly (1871)
French Senators of the Third Republic
Senators of Charente-Maritime